Sérgio "Macarrão" de Toledo Machado (born 24 February 1945), also commonly known as Sérgio Macarrão, is a former Brazilian professional basketball player.

National team career
With the senior Brazilian national basketball team, Machado played at the 1967 FIBA World Cup, and the 1970 FIBA World Cup. He also played at the 1964 Summer Olympic Games, and the 1968 Summer Olympic Games.

Personal
Sérgio's brother, Renê Machado, was also a Brazilian club basketball player in the 1960s and 1970s. One of his nephews, Duda Machado, was also a basketball player with the senior men's Brazilian national basketball team. Another one of his nephews, Marcelinho Machado, was also a long-time professional basketball player, and he is one of the most well-known players Brazil ever produced.

References

1945 births
Living people
Brazilian men's basketball players
1967 FIBA World Championship players
1970 FIBA World Championship players
Olympic basketball players of Brazil
Basketball players at the 1964 Summer Olympics
Basketball players at the 1968 Summer Olympics
Olympic medalists in basketball
Olympic bronze medalists for Brazil
Medalists at the 1964 Summer Olympics